Hamilton is a city that serves as the county seat of Ravalli County, Montana, United States. The population was 4,659 at the 2020 census.

History
Hamilton was founded by copper king Marcus Daly in the late 19th century. It was named for J.W. Hamilton, who provided the right-of-way to the railroad. Daly is said to have wanted to begin business in the then county seat of Grantsdale, but was denied the opportunity. He supposedly founded Hamilton out of his own pocket as a reaction to being rebuffed at Grantsdale.

The Ravalli County Museum, founded in 1955, is located in the former Ravalli County Courthouse and focuses on County history, natural history and art.

In the summer of 2000, Hamilton made international headlines when forest fires throughout the Bitterroot Valley filled the area with smoke and prompted the evacuation of many residents. President Clinton declared a state of emergency in the area and dispatched National Guard troops to assist with fighting the fires.

Hamilton is, as of 2004, home to two microbiological research and production facilities: the government-run Rocky Mountain Laboratories, and a branch of the Corixa Corporation (bought in the late 1990s from Ribi ImmunoChem Research, Inc.). The Corixa Corporation was bought by GlaxoSmithKline in 2005. NIAID (National Institute of Allergy and Infectious Diseases) completed construction of a Biosafety Level 4 biohazard laboratory as part of the Rocky Mountain Laboratories (RML) facility in 2008. This facility has begun operations using highly-pathogenic organisms including the Lentivirus family of viruses.

Hamilton had one of the last remaining Kmart stores in the United States, which was the only remaining one in the state of Montana and the entire Mountain time zone. However, plans to close the Kmart store were announced in January 2022, with its final day of business conducted on March 6, 2022.

Geography and climate
Hamilton is located at  (46.248412, -114.159852).

According to the Köppen climate classification, Hamilton has a humid continental climate.

Demographics

2010 census
As of the census of 2010, there were 4,348 people, 2,175 households, and 1,006 families living in the city. The racial makeup of the city was 95.0% White, 0.3% African American, 0.6% Native American, 1.4% Asian, 0.2% from other races, and 2.5% from two or more races. Hispanic or Latino of any race were 3.1% of the population.

There were 2,175 households, of which 23.6% had children under the age of 18 living with them, 30.6% were married couples living together, 11.7% had a female householder with no husband present, 3.9% had a male householder with no wife present, and 53.7% were non-families. 47.0% of all households were made up of individuals, and 22.8% had someone living alone who was 65 years of age or older. The average household size was 1.92 and the average family size was 2.72.

The median age in the city was 43 years. 20.1% of residents were under the age of 18; 7.4% were between the ages of 18 and 24; 24.4% were from 25 to 44; 23.4% were from 45 to 64; and 24.7% were 65 years of age or older. The gender makeup of the city was 46.6% male and 53.4% female.

2000 census
As of the census of 2000, there were 3,705 people, 1,772 households, and 855 families living in the city. The population density was 1,603.6 people per square mile (619.3/km2). There were 1,915 housing units at an average density of 828.8 per square mile (320.1/km2). The racial makeup of the city was 96.22% White, 0.11% African American, 0.89% Native American, 0.78% Asian, 0.22% from other races, and 1.78% from two or more races. Hispanic or Latino of any race were 1.65% of the population.

There were 1,772 households, out of which 22.3% had children under the age of 18 living with them, 36.3% were married couples living together, 9.5% had a female householder with no husband present, and 51.7% were non-families. 47.6% of all households were made up of individuals, and 24.9% had someone living alone who was 65 years of age or older. The average household size was 1.95 and the average family size was 2.81.

In the city, the population was spread out, with 20.2% under the age of 18, 6.8% from 18 to 24, 24.0% from 25 to 44, 20.6% from 45 to 64, and 28.3% who were 65 years of age or older. The median age was 44 years. For every 100 females, there were 82.2 males. For every 100 females age 18 and over, there were 74.9 males.

The median income for a household in the city was $22,013, and the median income for a family was $30,665. Males had a median income of $25,795 versus $22,138 for females. The per capita income for the city was $14,689. About 14.3% of families and 17.8% of the population were below the poverty line, including 28.4% of those under age 18 and 15.3% of those age 65 or over.

Infrastructure
Ravalli County Airport is a public use airport 1 mile east of town.

Education
Hamilton High School
The Bitterroot College Program of the University of Montana is located in Hamilton. In May 2012, it was renamed Bitterroot College University of Montana.

The Bitterroot Public Library serves the town of Hamilton. It was one of the 17 Carnegie libraries built in Montana.

City Council
Hamilton has three Wards with two representatives from each Ward.

Notable people
 Willy Burgdorfer, scientist who discovered the cause of Lyme disease
 Herald Rea Cox, bacteriologist
 Marcus Daly, one of the "Copper Kings" of Butte, Montana, owned the Bitterroot Stock Farm near Hamilton
 Scott Lee Kimball, Colorado-born serial killer who lived in Hamilton during his teenage years.
 Henry L. Myers, United States Senator from Montana
 Jerry J. O'Connell, United States Representative from Montana, editor and publisher of local newspaper
 Val Skinner, golfer, winner of six LPGA Tour events
Suzanna Son, film actress known for Red Rocket
 Michael D. Stevens, former Master Chief Petty Officer of the Navy

References

External links
 Ravalli Republic newspaper
 Hamilton, Montana community website

 
Cities in Montana
Cities in Ravalli County, Montana
County seats in Montana